The Lausanne trolleybus system forms part of the public transport network of Lausanne, in the canton of Vaud, Switzerland.  The system has been in operation since 1932 and is the third-oldest surviving trolleybus system in the world, after those of Shanghai and Philadelphia.

Today, the system is the largest in Switzerland; it is supplemented by the Lausanne Metro, and by various conventional bus routes.

The system is operated by Transports publics de la région lausannoise (TL) – formerly Tramways Lausannois – and comprises 10 trolleybus lines, serving not only Lausanne, but also the neighbouring municipalities of Le Mont-sur-Lausanne, Lutry, Paudex, Prilly, Pully and Renens.  Following some line closures, the system no longer serves Cugy, Epalinges and Froideville.

History
Opened on 2 October 1932, the Lausanne system was only the second trolleybus system to open in Switzerland, preceded by the rural Fribourg–Farvagny trolleybus system.  That line closed earlier in 1932. The Lausanne system was therefore the country's only trolleybus system at the time of its opening, and it retained this distinction until the opening of the Winterthur trolleybus system, in 1938.

The Lausanne system's first line was between Lausanne railway station and Ouchy.  In 1938–1939, a number of additional lines were opened, and between 1938 and 1964 the system gradually replaced the Lausanne tramway network.

On 9 April 1951, the tram line to Montheron was replaced by a trolleybus line. On 7 January 1964, trolleybus line 7 replaced tram line 9, which had been closed the previous day.  By that year, there were 10 trolleybus lines in Lausanne.

On 1 June 1969, a suburban trolleybus line to Le Chalet-à-Gobet was launched. On 3 June 1973, line 5 was extended to Epalinges, and on 1 June 1975, an extension of line 9 was opened to Lutry. On 2 June 1991, an extension was built to Bourdonnette, after which line 2 was discontinued.  A day later, line 15 was extended to Coudraie.

Lines 
Today, the network has 10 lines:

Until completion of the extension in December 2011, every second service on this line was operated by articulated conventional buses - the extension was initially operated only every 20 minutes.

Some of the catenary masts used in constructing the extension of line 8 were recycled masts from the former interurban line 20 to Montheron. This line was powered by electricity until 1993; the catenary was dismantled in 1998.

Fleet

Retired fleet and heritage vehicles 
Upon its opening in 1932, the Lausanne system had just three trolleybuses, manufactured by FBW / SWS and fitted with electrical equipment by BBC. Two of these trolleybuses were rebuilt in 1964, and one of the rebuilt vehicles remains in existence to this day. In the second half of the 1930s, a further 32 trolleybuses were added to the fleet.

As of the end of 1964, the system had a large fleet of trolleybuses and 20 passenger carrying trailers. In 1975, 18 new trolleybuses arrived in Lausanne. Between 1982 and 1989, a total of 72 new trolleybuses were purchased. In 2001–2002, 28 Neoplan articulated trolleybuses were added to the fleet, replacing 29 rigid 12 m long vehicles built between 1964 and 1969. The Neoplan trolleybuses were eventually sold in 2010. 

Trailer no. 981 was retired in 2010, and has since been owned by the RétroBus Léman preservation society. It was the first low-floor trolleybus vehicle in Switzerland.  Trolleybus no. 2, dating back to the opening of the Lausanne system in 1932, has also been preserved and is now the oldest trolleybus in continental Europe.

During the 2000s, the TL also sold some withdrawn trolleybuses, including the Neoplans, to a Romanian used-bus dealer, who in turn sold them to the trolleybus operators in Sibiu and Ploiești.

653 and 950 (trailer) were sold to the Seashore Trolley Museum in Maine, USA.

Current fleet 
, the TL trolleybus fleet consisted of 58 rigid (two-axle) and 35 articulated vehicles.  There are also 53 trailers available for attachment to the rigid trolleybuses, the Lausanne trolleybus system being one of only two trolleybus systems worldwide that still utilise this form of operation (the other one is the Lucerne system).

In addition, the Lausanne system is, along with the La Chaux-de-Fonds and Lucerne systems, one of only three trolleybus systems in Switzerland still using rigid vehicles.  In the medium term, however, the rigid trolleybus-trailer combinations will be replaced by bi-articulated buses.

The 1970s-built trailers are the oldest trolleybus vehicles in regular service in Switzerland.  Six of these, nos. 953–957 and 971 had been withdrawn from service by April 2010.

Depots 
The Lausanne trolleybus fleet is stored in the La Borde and Perrelet depots.

See also
Lausanne railway station
List of trolleybus systems in Switzerland

Notes and references

External links

 RétroBus Léman – official site  
 
 

Transport in Lausanne
Lausanne
Lausanne
1932 establishments in Switzerland